The Tongji Bridge, is a famous stone arch bridge located in Yuyao, Zhejiang, China. "Tongji Bridge" ("Tong" means transport/transportantion, "Ji" means aid or cross a river) is a very common name for bridges in ancient China.

History

The bridge has a very long history. It is the first large-sized arch bridge in the Eastern Zhejiang region, so it's also called the First Bridge of Eastern Zhe; "Zhe" is the short name for Zhejiang Province).

The construction of the bridge started first during the Qingli Era (1041–1048) of the Northern Song Dynasty, and it was wooden structure. Its original name was Dehui Bridge. And its name later was changed to Hong Bridge ("Hong" means rainbow). It was destroyed in wars and reconstructed for several times.

In Yuan dynasty, a Buddhist monk named Huixing started rebuilding the bridge using rocks, but he died when the construction was half-finished. Then a Taoist named Li Daoning continued his unfinished work. In the third year (year 1332) of the Zhishun Era of the Yuan dynasty, the bridge was finally finished, and was renamed as "Tongji Bridge". There was a stone tablet aside the bridge, and there were eight characters on the stele - Hai Bo Guo er Feng Fan bu Xie, which  means ships can go through the bridge's arch without any obstacles.

From the 7th to the 9th Year (1729–1731) of the Yongzheng Era in Qing dynasty, the local government repaired and rebuilt most part of the bridge again, and that's the bridge nowadays looks like.

Present

The bridge nowadays is still in use and has busy traffic every day. The bridge has three spans, with the central/main span the largest one, and the rest two are equal. The main span is 14.2 meter. The total length of the bridge is about 50 meters. It has 106 steps.

In front of the bridge, it was the old city gate of Yuyao, which is also an ancient structure which is named Shunjiang Building. The bridge and the old city gate together now are the key cultural relic under the city's protection.

See also
 Tongji Bridge: a Tongji Bridge located in Jinhua, Zhejiang Province.
 Arch bridge

References

External links
 
 A photo album of Yuyao Tongji Bridge
 Tourism guidance for Yuyao Tongji Bridge 
 Tongji Bridge and Shunjiang Tower 

Arch bridges in China
Bridges in Ningbo
Chinese architectural history
Stone bridges in China
Yuyao